East Worthing is a residential area of Worthing in the Worthing district, in the county of West Sussex, England, situated immediately to the east of Worthing town centre.  It is bounded by the West Coastway railway line and Broadwater to the north, Brooklands Park to the east, Homefield Park and Worthing town centre to the west and the English Channel coast to the south.

History

Like the early hamlet of Worthing, the area of modern East Worthing was initially part of the parish of Broadwater.  In the 19th century the first few houses in existence were economically dependent on the 18th-century brickworks and two smock mills in the vicinity, both of which existed by 1831.

Development spread east of Worthing town centre around 1850.  Gradually, the town expanded to the east, and in the 1860s a church was proposed to serve the area, which had become known as East Worthing.  Large detached villas were built along Farncombe Road and Selden Road and St George's Church was built in 1868 in anticipation of further development to the east.  To the east of Ham Road large areas were used for the area's glasshouse industry for growing fruit and flowers.

Significant erosion of the coastline took place over the course of the 19th century, with at least 70 yards of land lost.  The earlier coast road to Lancing was -100 yards to the south of the present day coast road on Brighton Road.  Rebuilt further inland in 1874, the original Half Brick Inn was washed away in 1869.

In the Edwardian period development continued east of St George's Church along Brighton Road, St George's Road and Alexandra Road.  By the inter-war period development had reached the banks of the Teville Stream with the building of Seamill Park Crescent.

Governance
East Worthing lies within the borough of Worthing and mostly lies within Selden ward, which has three councillors that represent the area on Worthing Borough Council.  For elections to West Sussex County Council most of the area is represented by the Worthing East electoral division.  The area is represented at Westminster by the East Worthing and Shoreham constituency.

Architecture

Buildings of note include those along Farncombe Road, St George's Church (1868) by George Truefitt and the Church of St Charles Borromeo (1962) by Henry Bingham Towner.

Transport
East Worthing railway station has westbound services to Worthing (central) and West Worthing and eastbound services to Brighton. It opened in 1905 as Ham Bridge Halt.

Buses are provided by Stagecoach South including the Coastliner 700 service to Worthing town centre, Shoreham-by-Sea and Brighton.

Notable residents
 Edwin Bennett, cricketer
 William A. Dunkerley, author
 W.E. Henley, poet
 Elsie Oxenham, author
 Tom Pearce, cricketer

References

Bibliography

 
 

Suburbs of Worthing